Chronicles, released in 1993, is the first of David Arkenstone's several compilation albums.

Track listing
"The North Wind" 
"Ballet" 
"Ancient Legend" 
"Borderlands" 
"The Rug Merchant" 
"Passage" 
"Stepping Stars" 
"Firedance" 
"Desert Ride"
"Voices of the Anasazi"
"Papillon (On the Wings of the Butterfly)"
"Hindu Holiday" 
"From the Forge to the Field" 
"Valley in the Clouds" 
"Out of the Forest and Into the Trees"
"The Southern Cross"
"Glory"

References

David Arkenstone albums
1993 compilation albums
Narada Productions compilation albums